Covington is a city in, and the county seat of, Fountain County, Indiana, United States. The population was 2,645 at the 2010 census.

History

Fountain County was formed on April 1, 1826. Later that year, the county seat was established at Covington, and a two-story frame courthouse was built in 1827. The location of the county seat was a point of contention for some years, as Covington was not centrally located in the county. In 1831 an act was passed that called for the relocation of the county seat, but after further discussion it was decided that it should remain where it was. Eventually the coming of the railroads helped to alleviate the geographical concern. A brick courthouse was completed in 1833.

The Carnegie Library of Covington, Covington Courthouse Square Historic District, Covington Residential Historic District, Fountain County Clerk's Building, Fountain County Courthouse, and William C.B. Sewell House are listed on the National Register of Historic Places.

Geography

Covington is located at  (40.140518, -87.393106). It lies in the west part of Fountain County along the Wabash River, where U.S. Route 136 crosses the river.

Demographics

As of the 2010 United States Census, there were 2,645 people, 1,120 households, and 712 families residing here. The racial makeup was 97.6% white, 0.5% American Indian, 0.3% Asian, 0.2% black or African American, 0.4% from other races, and 1.1% from two or more races. Those of Hispanic or Latino origin made up 1.1% of the population. In terms of ancestry, 23.0% were German, 13.6% were Irish, 13.4% were American, and 12.9% were English.

Of the 1,120 households, 28.5% had children under the age of 18 living with them, 48.8% were married couples living together, 11.3% had a female householder with no husband present, 36.4% were non-families, and 32.8% of all households were made up of individuals. The average household size was 2.25 and the average family size was 2.83. The median age was 44.0 years.

The median income for a household was $47,545 and the median income for a family was $60,913. Males had a median income of $41,354 versus $33,551 for females. The per capita income for was $24,694. About 4.0% of families and 6.7% of the population were below the poverty line, including 12.1% of those under age 18 and 7.3% of those age 65 or over.

Education
The Covington Community School Corporation consists of one elementary school, one middle school, and one high school, all located within Covington.

The town has a public library, a branch of the Covington-Veedersburg Public Library.

Contemporary life 

The Covington Business Association sponsors the town's Apple Festival, which happens each autumn around the town square.

The City of Covington maintains a robust park and trail system.

Transportation
Interstate 74 passes by the south edge of Covington, traveling east toward Indianapolis, Indiana, and west toward Champaign, Illinois.  U.S. Route 136 passes through the middle of town, traveling west toward Danville, Illinois, and east toward Veedersburg.

Notable people
Lee Clingan, former member of the  Indiana State Senate.
Dale Grubb, former member of the Indiana House of Representatives.
Cecil M. Harden, United States Representative.
Caroline Henderson Griffiths, philanthropist
John T. Myers, United States Representative.
Eugene Savage, painter and sculptor. 
Wilber Moore Stilwell, painter.
Charles Stewart Voorhees (1853–1909) lawyer and two-term Delegate to U.S. Congress from the Territory of Washington.
Lew Wallace, Union Army general and author of Ben Hur.
Susan Wallace, author and poet and wife of Lew Wallace.

References

Bibliography

External links

 City of Covington ''
 Covington Community Foundation
 Covington Circle Trail
 

Cities in Indiana
Cities in Fountain County, Indiana
County seats in Indiana